Home School Valedictorian is the second album by Las Vegas, Nevada hard rock band Adelitas Way, released on June 7, 2011. Home School Valedictorian has sold over 120,000 copies in the US and over 500,000 singles, becoming the band's best-selling album to date.

History 
Adelitas Way entered the studio in September 2010 with writer/producer Dave Bassett and Tadpole in Malibu, California to record the band's follow up to their self-titled debut on Virgin Records.

The song "I Wanna Be" features guest vocals by Tyler Connolly, the vocalist/guitarist for the Canadian rock band Theory of a Deadman.

Release and promotion

On January 31, the band announced that their new album Home School Valedictorian would be released on May 17. On February 4, they premiered their first single from the Home School Valedictorian album on KOMP 92.3 titled "Sick". It was then announced the band's new album, Home School Valedictorian, would be pushed back to June 7.

The first single off the album, "Sick", was released to radio on April 5, and was released as single on iTunes and Amazon on March 15. It reached No. 1 on the Active Rock chart, becoming the band's first No. 1 single. On April 15, a sample was put on the Adelitas Way YouTube channel of the upcoming album. The band's follow-up single, "The Collapse", was released on August 22 to rock radio and reached No. 3 on the Active Rock chart and No. 10 on Mainstream Rock Radio chart.

"Criticize" was the third single, and reached No. 1 on the Active Rock chart, giving the band two No. 1 songs off the record. The fourth single, "Alive", was featured and performed live by the band on ABC's Bachelor Pad, and climbed multiple radio charts. It reached No. 6 on the Active Rock chart in early 2013.

Track listing

Charts

Personnel
 Rick DeJesus — lead vocals
 Keith Wallen — rhythm guitar, backing vocals
 Robert Zakaryan - lead guitar
 Derek Johnston — bass guitar
 Trevor "Tre" Stafford — drums, percussion

References

2011 albums
Virgin Records albums
Adelitas Way albums